

History 
The site upon which St. Colman's was built was bought by Fr. Timothy Murphy in 1856. Murphy commissioned John Pine Hurley to design the new College building. Twenty months after construction began, St. Colman's opened its doors to its first students in 1858. The original College building is three storeys in height and boasts an impressive six-storey tower. The facade of red sandstone with limestone facings. The building, with its tall tower, has since become an iconic structure in Fermoy and looms over the town's skyline. A west wing was added in 1887 while the school chapel was added in the early 1900s. A new classroom block was added to the College in 1969. This new block boasted a large assembly hall and twenty-two classrooms. A library in the College, known among the students and faculty as the Priest's Library, houses many rare manuscripts and books. From the very beginning, St. Colman's welcomed boarders from all over Munster; however, boarding ceased in the College in 2003.now

Sport
The College has a strong hurling tradition and has won the Dr. Harty Cup nine times (1948, 1949, 1977, 1992, 1996, 1997, 2001, 2002 & 2003). Today all teams are represented by local club players.
Today the sport is as strong as ever but the College also has a much more diverse sporting ethos. The College has successful in competition with sports as diverse as equestrian, pitch and putt, tennis, swimming, rugby (former Leinster and Ireland prop Mike Ross being a past pupil), cricket, basketball, and badminton in recent years.

The St. Colman's Health & Fitness Campus, a huge redevelopment of the College's sports grounds, was opened in 2015. The project included the building of brand new dressing rooms and showers, three full sized tennis courts and a fitness walkway around the Harty pitch.

Notable alumni

The arts
No notable art graduates.

Sports
 Liam Kearney, football player, League of Ireland champion 2005, FAI Cup winner 2007, Setanta Sports Cup winner 2008 (Cork City) League of Ireland champion 2006 (Shelbourne)
 Canon Bertie Troy, Cork hurling manager, photographer, and faculty of the College (1957-1977)
 Mike Ross, Irish rugby player
 Andrew O'Shaughnessy, Kilmallock, Limerick Hurler. All Ireland Finalist 2007
 Stephen Molumphy, Ballyduff, Waterford Hurler, All Ireland Finalist 2008
 Aidan Kearney, Tallow, Waterford Hurler, All Ireland Finalist 2008
 Timmy McCarthy, Castlelyons,  Cork Hurler, All Ireland Champion 1999/2004/05  
 Brian Murphy, Bride Rovers, Cork Hurler, All Ireland Champion 2004/05
 Fergal McCormack, Mallow, Cork Hurler, All Ireland Champion 1999
 Mark Landers, Killeagh, Cork Senior Hurling Winning Captain 1999
 Seánie O'Leary, Youghal, Cork Hurler, All Ireland Winner 1976/77/78/1984, All Ireland U21 1970/71/73 Minor 1969/1970 
 Barry Murphy, Scarriff, Clare All Ireland Hurling Champion 1997
 Colm Spillane, Castlelyons, Cork Senior Hurler, Munster Winner  2017
 Niall O'Leary, Castlelyons, Cork Senior Hurler, All Ireland Finalist 2021
 Eoin Murphy, Waterford Senior Hurler
 Bertie Troy, also taught at the school

Christian mission
 William Barry DD (1872-1929), Archbishop of Hobart, Tasmania
 David Keane, Bishop of LImerick (RC) 1923-1945
 Fachtna O'Driscoll, Superior General of the Society of African Missions worldwide, 2013-2019.

Irish history
One of the seven signatories of the 1916 Proclamation, Thomas McDonagh, taught in St. Colman's for a period of time.

References

External links
 St. Colman's College, Fermoy, Co. Cork, Ireland

Secondary schools in County Cork
Educational institutions established in 1858
Boys' schools in the Republic of Ireland
1858 establishments in Ireland
People educated at St Colman's College, Fermoy